Herman Le Compte (April 26, 1929, in Aalst – January 3, 2008, in Knokke) was a Belgian physician and gerontologist.

Biography
Known across his native Flanders as the "Vitamin Doctor," Le Compte became famous during the 1960s with a series of books and TV shows dedicated to health and aging. He claimed that vitamins and yeast would increase longevivity, and called for elders taking a more active role in society. His claims led to a lifelong ban by the Belgian medical association.

Despite the ban he continued to practise medicine leading to his arrest.
After a two decade legal fight he was vindicated by the ECHR and legally allowed to practise again.

Le Compte died in his sleep of a heart attack on January 3, 2008, in Knokke, Belgium.

Quotes

Bibliography
 Herman Le Compte: Qui Encore a Peur de Moi? Le Credo du Herman Le Compte., Banana Press 1973
 Herman Le Compte: Het is niet nodig gek te zijn, maar het kan helpen, Gottmer 1974, 
 Herman Le Compte: Wir Kinder des Methusalem: Alters-Chancen der jungen Gesellschaft,  Econ-Verlag 1978, ab 1980 als Lizenzausgabe bei Droemer-Knaur, 
 Herman Le Compte, Pia Pervenche: So lebt man länger nach Dr LeComptes Erfolgsmethode : vital und gesund bis ins hohe Alter, Falken-Verlag 1982,

References

External link

Belgian gerontologists
Medical controversies in Belgium
People convicted for health fraud
1929 births
2008 deaths
People from Aalst, Belgium
20th-century Belgian physicians